Acachmena may refer to:
 Acachmena (butterfly), a genus of butterflies in the family Nolidae
 Acachmena, a genus of insects in the family Uraniidae, synonym of Cathetus
 Acachmena, a genus of plants in the family Brassicaceae, synonym of Erysimum